The following is a list of formats for web feeds for web syndication where content is made available from one website to other sites..

Major markup languages
Atom
RSS

Minor markup languages
FeedSync
GData Google Code
hAtom
Hina-Di
LIRS
NewsML
NewsML-G2
EventsML-G2
SportsML-G2
ICE
OCS
OPDS
OML
OPML
RDF feed
RSS enclosure
Simple List Extensions
SyncML
XOXO
PubSubHubbub

Specialized markup languages
EventRSS - for social events
GeoRSS - for transferring geoinformation
Media RSS - for transferring Media content

Historical
CDF
Marimba
MCF
NewsML 1
PointCast
SportsML

Content syndication markup languages
Lists of markup languages